The Mercedes-Benz W205 is the fourth generation of the Mercedes-Benz C-Class which was produced by Daimler AG between 2014 and 2021. The W205 C-Class was preceded by the W204 C-Class and superseded by the W206 C-Class. The fourth-generation C-Class was available in sedan (W205), station wagon/estate (S205), coupe (C205), cabriolet (A205) and long-wheelbase sedan (V205) body styles.

The W205 was the first vehicle to use the all-new Modular Rear Architecture (MRA) platform. The new structure is significantly lighter, using aluminum extensively throughout the body, resulting in a  weight decrease. According to Mercedes-Benz, the structure is much more rigid than other vehicles in its class.

Development and launch 

The car was officially unveiled on 16 December 2013 and debuted at the 2014 North American International Auto Show. W205 production commenced on 4 February 2014 at the Bremen plant. European sales began in March 2014, while the vehicle went on sale in North America in September 2014, and in South Africa in March 2015.

As the Mercedes-Benz CLA-Class (released in April 2013) took the mantle of being the new entry-level sedan in Mercedes' line up of cars, Mercedes decided to make the W205 C-Class larger than its predecessor and more like the W222 S-Class, thus making it a "mini-S-Class".

The W205 included Sport and Luxury trims with  2.0-liter turbocharged I4 engine and  3.0-liter bi-turbo V6 engine options. Mercedes all-wheel drive 4MATIC is standard across the initial offering. The car is about  longer and  wider than the W204.

Based on the new modular MRA rear-wheel drive platform, it features front axle four-link and rear axle five-link suspension.

Equipment 
 Optional AIRMATIC continuously Adaptive Damping System Plus
 Nine airbags as standard
 ESP Dynamic Cornering Assist
 Traffic Sign Assist with Speed Limit Assist
 COLLISION PREVENTION ASSIST PLUS (as standard)
 ATTENTION ASSIST (as standard), ADAPTIVE BRAKE (as standard)
 DISTRONIC PLUS with Steering Assist
 Brake Assist system BAS PLUS with Cross-Traffic Assist
 NECK-PRO crash-responsive head restraints
 PRE-SAFE, PRE-SAFE Brake, Pre-Safe with pedestrian detection and City Brake function
 Active bonnet, Active Lane Keeping Assist
 Full-LED headlamps with Intelligent Light System and Adaptive Highbeam Assist PLUS
 Head-up display, COMAND Online with Touchpad
 Active Parking Assist, Active Blind Spot Assist, Backup camera
 Electric parking brake with emergency braking function

Variants

C 350e Plug-in Hybrid (2015–2019) 

A plug-in hybrid version was introduced at the January 2015 North American International Auto Show, available in both Saloon and Estate variants. The C 350e has a haptic accelerator pedal.

In 2018, Mercedes-Benz released another plug-in hybrid C 350 – but this time it is a variant with a diesel engine.

C-Class Coupe (2015–2022) 

Debuted at the 2015 Frankfurt Auto Show, the appearance of the C-Class coupe leans heavily on that of the 2014 C-Class saloon. The two cars share the same basic front-end styling treatment through to the leading edge of the doors. From the back, the second-generation C-Class Coupé closely mimics the design of the 2014 S-Class Coupé.

The interior uses the same dashboard and switchgear as the 2014 C-Class saloon, but the C-Class coupe receives unique front sports seats with integral headrests as well as two individual rear seats. Because of the absence of a B-pillar, there is also a standard automatic seatbelt feeder similar to that used by the 2014 E-Class Coupé.

A Bluetooth-compatible entertainment system allowing internet capability through a mobile phone is standard. Also included is the Attention Assist function, which warns the driver of inattentiveness and drowsiness.

As part of Mercedes-Benz's efforts to establish itself at the forefront of autonomous driving technology, the 2015 C-Class Coupé also comes with an optional Distronic Plus system.

C-Class Cabriolet (2016–2022)

Mercedes-Benz’s first-ever C-Class Cabriolet (in fact the only compact cabriolet since 1955) was revealed at the 2016 Geneva Motor Show. Based on the C-Class Coupé, the four-seat soft-top keeps the same basic dimensions as the coupé, but is marginally taller. When open, the roof is stored in the boot.

The interior of the C-Class Cabriolet is almost identical to that of the coupé but includes heat-reflecting leather and a switch on the centre console to open and close the roof. The sports seats also include Mercedes’ AIRSCARF heating system, while the AIRCAP system stops draughts inside the cabin.

Drivetrain (2014-2018)

Engines

Transmissions

Safety

AMG models

C 450 AMG Sport 4MATIC (2015-2017), AMG C 43 (2017-2022) 

The C 450 AMG 4MATIC replaced the C 400 4MATIC. Some components, such as the front axle, steering system and suspension are shared with the C 63. It has all-wheel drive and is paired to a 7-speed automatic transmission. It reaches  in 4.9 seconds.

For the 2017 model year, the C450 AMG was renamed to AMG C 43. It retains the same 3.0-litre twin-turbo but is now mated with a 9-speed automatic transmission and some cosmetic changes.

AMG C 63/C 63 S (2015–2021) 

The AMG C 63 uses a similar 4.0-liter turbocharged V8 to the Mercedes-AMG GT sports car.

The car still uses a seven-speed automatic transmission that sends power to the rear wheels and gets three-stage adaptive dampers specific to AMG models along with speed-sensitive variable steering. High-performance brakes are also a part of the package with  discs in front and  discs in the rear. On both ends of the car there are AMG-branded calipers. Its first deliveries took place in early 2015 for the European market with a U.S. debut later in the year.

The Estate variant served as the official Medical Car of Formula One between 2015 and 2021, and has since been replaced by the Mercedes-AMG GT 4-Door Coupé.

AMG C 63/C 63 S Coupe & Cabriolet (2016–2022) 

Mercedes-Benz also revealed the high-performance C 63 coupe from Mercedes-AMG at the 2015 Frankfurt Auto Show. The C 63 coupe features many distinct design elements to set it apart from its tamer sibling. The most obvious is the aggressive front bumper, which features larger scoops to feed more air to the car's twin-turbocharged 4.0-litre V-8 as well as to its high-performance brakes. The grille is also unique, and the hood features some muscular ripples that the regular C-Class Coupe does not.

The C 63 coupe also benefits from a wider track, as evidenced by the pumped wheel arches. The wheels are also bigger on the Mercedes-AMG model with 19 inches in diameter. The C-Class Coupe comes with 18-in wheels as standard.

The mechanical package is almost identical to the C 63 sedan. Drive will be to the rear wheels only, via a paddle-shifted, seven-speed automatic transmission.

2018 facelift 

The facelift versions were released in 2018 for the 2019 model year. Changes include:
LED headlights plus LED DRLs as standard. Option for the LED High-Performance headlamps or the Multibeam LED headlights with Ultra Range High Beam units.
Can be equipped with the 12.3-inch infotainment display and a 10.25-inch free-standing infotainment display.
Semi-autonomous features such as Active Lane Assist, Active Emergency Stop Assist and Active Steering Assist. Mercedes's DISTRONIC feature uses satellite data to control the cruising speed.
An updated interior design, with silver elements. The car also got new colour options for the interior, namely, Magma Grey, Black and Saddle Brown.
The steering wheel now features touchpads for controlling both displays, and the optional centre console touchpad now features haptic feedback.
New Energizing comfort control system that links the climate control, air fragrance and seat heating, ventilation and massage functions.
Three diesel models: the 148 hp C 200d, 192 hp C 220d (which arrived first) and 241 hp C 300d. Each runs Mercedes’ latest 2.0-litre four-cylinder diesel engine.
Three petrol models feature in the line-up: the C 180, C 200 (the first to go on sale) and C 300. The C 180 uses a 1.6-litre turbo engine that produces 154 bhp in the SLC 180. The C 200 and C 300 both have Mercedes’ new four-cylinder petrol engine.
In the C 200, the mild hybrid with EQ Boost badging, the engine delivers a nominal 181 hp, with an added 13 hp available on kick down when the alternator acts as an electric motor to boost performance.
In the C 300, the engine is in a higher state of tune, at 255 hp, but does not have electric assistance.
A nine-speed 9G-TRONIC transmission is expected to remain standard on all but the most basic of models.
The Mercedes-AMG C 43 uses the same 3.0-litre twin-turbo V6 engine, but gets larger turbos. Power now stands at 385 hp (23 hp more than before).
The Mercedes-AMG C 43 Coupe' 4MATIC Special EDITION is the Limited Edition for Mercedes-Benz C-Class Coupe Produced 120 Units in Thailand.

Engines (2018–2021)

Transmissions (2018–2021)

See also 

 Mercedes-AMG C-Coupé DTM

References

External links 

Cars introduced in 2014
Compact executive cars
Motor vehicles manufactured in the United States
W205
W205
Plug-in hybrid vehicles
Sedans
Station wagons